A Death in Shonagachhi is a fictional novel written  by Rijula Das. It was published on  28 July, 2021 by Picador India.

Reception
The Times of India wrote in a review "Although the novel is not quite a murder mystery or a crime novel, it is much more than that."

The Hindu wrote in a review "Das employs a measured pace; there is a restraint to her prose through which the pain of most of the characters (pimp and cop included) peeps through."

References

2021 debut novels
2021 Indian novels
Picador (imprint) books